Stapelholm was an Amt ("collective municipality") in the district of Schleswig-Flensburg, in Schleswig-Holstein, Germany. It was situated on the north bank of the river Eider, approx. 25 km southwest of Schleswig. The seat of the Amt was in Norderstapel. In January 2008, it was merged with the Amt Kropp to form the Amt Kropp-Stapelholm.

The Amt Stapelholm consisted of the following municipalities:

Bergenhusen 
Erfde 
Meggerdorf 
Norderstapel
Süderstapel
Tielen
Wohlde 

Former Ämter in Schleswig-Holstein